William Wirt Watkins (April 1, 1826 – January 15, 1898) was an American politician. He was born in Jefferson County, Tennessee, and later moved to Arkansas, where he served in the state senate 1856 to 1860, 1866, and 1878. He was a delegate to the Provisional Congress of the Confederate States from 1861 to 1862.

See also
 List of people from Tennessee

References

External links
 
 William Wirt Watkins at The Political Graveyard

1826 births
1898 deaths
19th-century American politicians
Arkansas lawyers
Democratic Party Arkansas state senators
Burials in Arkansas
Deputies and delegates to the Provisional Congress of the Confederate States
People from Jefferson County, Tennessee
People of Arkansas in the American Civil War
19th-century American lawyers